Hartford Township, Ohio, may refer to:

Hartford Township, Licking County, Ohio
Hartford Township, Trumbull County, Ohio

Ohio township disambiguation pages